Jacobus van Eynde or van den Eynde (fl. 1696–1729; died 17 January 1729) was a Flemish organ builder.

Biography
Both place and date of van Eynde's birth are currently unknown. He was likely the son of Pierre van Eynde, organist of the Church of Saint-Éloi in Dunkirk (French Flanders, then part of the Habsburg Netherlands). Pierre was organist in Saint-Éloi from 1684 to 1718. It is not known where Jacobus learned his art, but he probably studied with Jan and Guilielmus . 

He was renowned for the quality of his instruments and was referred to as the pinnacle of the West Flemish Baroque. He can be regarded as the most important organ builder in the county of Flanders until the beginning of the 18th century. His work was the pinnacle of the  school, via Nicolaas Helewoudt and Jan and Guilielmus van Belle.

From 1696 van Eynde lived in Ypres. His organ building can be divided into three periods: Franco-Flemish (until 1707), Bruges (1707-1719), Ypres (1719-1729). In 1718 he completed the organ for the Cathedral of Bruges.

Van Eynde's style is part of the line of continuity that can be discerned in the 17th-century South Flemish organ building, heralded by Matthys Langhedul and further spread by the Ypres Jan and Guilielmus Van Belle and the Bruges residents Nicolaas Helewout and Boudewijn Ledou. There are a number of characteristics from the school of Nicolaas van Hagen - passed on to the Van Belle 's work through his companion François van Isacker.

List of organs
 1696: Sint-Aldegondiskerk, Saint-Omer, now in Nielles-lès-Ardres
 1701: Sint-Jan-Baptistkerk, Saint-Omer
 1703: Saint-Omer Cathedral, Saint-Omer
 Church of Saint-Éloi, Dunkirk
 1707: Sint-Annakerk, Bruges 
 1710: Sint-Maartenskerk
 1711: St. Trudo's Abbey, Bruges
 1714: Abbey Church of Lo
 1715: Onze-Lieve-Vrouwkerk, Poperinge, destroyed during the First World War
 1716: Klooster Engelendale, transferred to the parish church of Stalhille and kept there almost intact
 1717: Onze-Lieve-Vrouw-Onbevlekt-Ontvangenkerk, Ver-Assebroek
 1717: Sint-Pietersbandenkerk, Oostkamp 
 1717–1719: St. Salvator's Cathedral Bruges (perhaps his biggest instrument)
 Lichtervelde
 Sint-Pieterskerk, Esen
 1718: Sint-Wandregesiluskerk, Bollezeele
 1728: Sint-Pieterskerk, Ypres, destroyed during the First World War

Further reading 
 A. Deschrevel, Het orgel in de Sint-Pieterskerk te Ieper. De Ieperse orgelbouwer Jacobus van Eynde, In: De Schalmei, vol. 4, no. 1, January 1949
 A. Deschrevel, Historische terugblik op het orgel in West-Vlaanderen, in: West-Vlaanderen, 1962.
 Ghislain Potvlieghe, Eynde, van, in: Winkler Prins Encyclopedie van Vlaanderen, vol. 2, Elsevier Sequoia, Brussels, 1973, p.446
 Ghislain Potvlieghe, Jacobus Van Eynde: leven, invloedssfeer en werk, in: Luister van het orgel in Vlaanderen, Leuven, 1974.
 Flor Peeters, Maarten Albert Vente, Ghislain Potvlieghe, et al., De orgelkunst in de Nederlanden van de 16de tot de 18de eeuw, Gaade/Amerongen, 1984.
 Luc Lannoo & Kamiel D'Hooghe, West-Vlaamse Orgelklanken, Bruges, 1997.

References

External links

Year of birth unknown
17th-century births
1729 deaths
People from Dunkirk
Flemish pipe organ builders